Gameplay of the collectible card game Magic: The Gathering is fueled by each player's deck of cards, which constitute the resources that player can call upon to battle their opponents in any given game. With more than 20,000 unique cards in the game, a considerable number of different decks can be constructed. Each card is designed to have certain strengths (and sometimes weaknesses) and therefore a significant part of the game is determined by which cards a player chooses to include in their deck. Broadly speaking, decks can be loosely classified based on their play style and mode of victory. The game's designers often explicitly create cards which are intended to fuel one or more of these given archetypes, in order to create competitive balance and diversity.

While the deck types listed below are specific to Magic: The Gathering, these concepts also extend to other collectible card games.

Deck archetypes
Most classifications of decks begin from one of four major strategies: aggro, control, combo and midrange.

Aggro
Aggro (short for "aggressive") decks attempt to reduce their opponents from 20 life to 0 life as quickly as possible, rather than emphasize a long-term game plan. Aggro decks focus on converting their cards into damage; they prefer to engage in a race for tempo rather than a card advantage-based attrition war. Aggro generally relies upon creatures as its accumulative source of damage. Aggro decks can quickly overwhelm unprepared opponents and proceed to eke out the last bit of damage they need to end the game. Aggro decks also generally have access to disruptive elements, which can inhibit the opponent's attempts to respond.

Example decks:
Suicide Black epitomizes Black's philosophy—win at all costs—and treats even its life total as an expendable resource.

Control
Control decks avoid racing. They attempt to slow the game down by executing an attrition plan. As the game progresses, control decks are able to take advantage of their slower, more powerful, cards. The primary strength of control decks is their ability to devalue the opponent’s cards. They do this in four ways:

 Answering threats at a reduced cost. Given the opportunity, Control decks can gain card advantage by answering multiple threats with one spell ("clearing"/"wiping" the board), stopping expensive threats with cheaper spells, and drawing multiple cards or forcing the opponent to discard multiple cards with one spell.
 Not playing threats to be answered. By playing few proactive spells of their own, control decks gain virtual card advantage by reducing the usefulness of opposing removal cards.
 Disrupting synergies. Even if control decks do not deal with every threat directly, they can leave out whichever ones stand poorly on their own; e.g., an enchantment which gives a bonus to creatures will never need attention if all enemy creatures are quickly neutralized.
 Dragging the game out past opposing preparations. An opponent's faster, efficient cards will become less effective over time.

Example decks:
This class of deck is nicknamed "Draw-Go," because most of its players' spells are instants designed to be played during his or her opponents' turns.
, supplemented by card-drawing like  and a number of disruptive spells.
It can also use cards like  to put the opponent on a timer.

Combo

Combo decks use the interaction of two or more cards (a "combination") to create a powerful effect that either wins the game immediately or creates a situation that subsequently leads to a win. Combo decks value consistency, speed, and resilience:  the deck should be reliable enough to produce the combo on a regular basis, the deck should be able to use the combo fast enough to win before the opponent, and the deck should be able to withstand disruption and still win.

Many decks have smaller, combo-like interactions between their cards, which is better described as synergy.

 Example decks:
Painter Combo, which uses  and chooses Blue to permit  to destroy any permanent or counter any spell, while also allowing  to put the opponent's entire library into their graveyard.
The loop generates mana and card drawing which is then used to end the game.
Belcher Combo, which uses free and efficient mana acceleration to play and activate , preferably on the first turn.  Because the deck has two or fewer lands, one activation of  will almost always kill the opponent.

Midrange
A typical midrange deck has an early game plan of mana ramp and control, but begins to play threats once it reaches four to six mana. A midrange deck will often seek to play a reactive, attrition-based game against aggro decks and a more proactive, tempo-based game against control decks. Colloquially, this is referred to as "going bigger" than aggro and "getting in under" control.
Example cards:  , 
Example decks:

Hybrid strategies

Aggro-Control
Aggro-control is a hybrid archetype that contains both aggressive creatures and control elements.  These decks attempt to deploy quick threats while protecting them with light permission and disruption long enough to win.  These are frequently referred to as "tempo" strategies, as they are built with a sense of timing. Tempo players look to control the game early and take advantage of a strong board state. Where purely control decks look to out class players with more quality in the later stages of the game, tempo looks to keep opponents off balance from the very start.

Example decks:
Naya Lightsaber, which uses powerful creatures like  and removal like , many of which also provide card advantage.

Control-Combo
Control-Combo is a control deck with a combo finisher that it can spring quickly if need be. A notable subtype of Control-Combo is "prison," which institutes control through resource denial (usually via a combo).

Example decks:
Trix, which gains life using  and then uses  to leave the opponent with the often deadly drawback.

Aggro-Combo
Aggro-combo decks employ aggressive creature strategies along with some combination of cards that can win in "combo" fashion with one big turn.  For instance, Ravager Affinity decks that include Disciple of the Vault can win by attacking with creatures and also with a combo finish of sacrificing multiple artifacts to Arcbound Ravager and killing the opponent with Disciple triggers.

Example decks:

Aggro-Control-Combo
Aggro-control-combo decks combine efficient, creature-based damage, heavy disruption elements, and an ability to unleash an extremely powerful synergy that can end the game in "combo" fashion.

Example decks:
If the opponent manages to deal with these cards, they are usually left vulnerable to the / and / combo which creates infinite creatures with haste to win the game.

In-depth Archetype Breakdown
Other than the traditional outlook grouping the decks into general buckets (aggro, control, midrange, combo), there are 2 modern outlooks breaking deck archetypes that are meant to more accurately describe how decks actually exploit different aspects of the game into winning conditions.

Aspect Analysis

Aspect analysis assigns very specific traits to 3 of the buckets and lists everything else as a combination of those. The 3 main buckets being aggro, control, and combo. Combinations and the inverse combinations may actually vary in the implemented strategies and aspects and therefore are generally not grouped in the same category. A great example of this is control-aggro (aka midrange) vs aggro-control (tempo). From these buckets, different strategies are drawn depending on the type of actual implementation of the deck in question. However, the vast majority of MTG decks use one or a combination of the following aspects to win.

 Linear - Executes own gameplan without necessary interaction with an opponent.
 Non-Linear - Executes strategies according to opponents play with a high amount of interaction.
 Fair - Transfers card advantage into board state, pressure and tempo. All cards have a potential of trading 1 for 1 (e.g. fair trading).
 Unfair - Does not transfer card advantage into board state, and do not cause pressure or create tempo. Mostly improvises its own gameplan using utility cards and trying to trade in their favor.
 Early Game - Provides pressure against an opponent, and sets a clock. Benefits from playing their cards fast before an opponent has a chance to stabilize and execute their gameplan.
 Late Game - Attempts to survive to the late game to play powerful cards and synergies for maximum value.

The graphic listed in this section explains how the traditional archetypes use these different aspects of MTG.

Axes analysis

The strategic axes analysis groups the different types of decks (aggro, control, combo, aggro-control, control-aggro aka midrange, prison, gimmick, meta) into combinations of the axes listed below. Some of these may overlap with Aspect Analysis.

 Threats vs Answers - A Threat is a card that can win the game if left unchecked, sometimes it includes the idea of smaller threats that combine to form a bigger threat. An Answer is a card that deals with or removes a threat. There are no wrong threats, only wrong answers.
 Tempo Vs Inevitability - Does your deck have to win fast, or does it have to survive the game long enough to stabilize and close out?
 Redundant vs Essential - Does your deck have a lot of cards that basically do the same thing, or does it rely on a few important key pieces to function?

The traditional archetypes fit into the axes in the following manner:

 Aggro: Threats, Tempo, Redundant - Every card is a threat, and every threat does the same thing: deal damage. Aggro decks try to beat out the opponent before they can fight back, and generally, have very little late-game if the opponent is able to stabilize.
 Control: Answers, Inevitable, Redundant - Control tries to have a lot of cards that take away opposing threats in the form of Bounces, Spot Removal, Board Wipes, and Counterspells. Control tries to survive the early game until it can establish its own threat, which is used to close out the late game.
 Combo: Threats, Inevitable, Essential - Each combo piece is not a threat in and of itself, but there is a high degree of inevitability to a deck that can flat-out win the game if it gets all the pieces together. Not as much redundancy as an aggro deck due to each combo piece being essential with few-to-no possible replacements.
 Aggro-Control: Answers, Tempo, Redundant - The flip side of Aggro that trades threats for answers. Tempo decks try to answer as much as they can but are only able to hold off the opponent for just long enough to finish them off.
 Control-Aggro/Midrange: Threats, Inevitable, Redundant - The flip side of Control deck that trades answers for threats. Each threat in a midrange deck is usually a big bomby problematic card. Eventually, you'll draw into enough of them to overwhelm the opponent.
 Prison: Answers, Inevitable, Essential - The flip side to Combo that trades threats for answers. Instead of establishing an "instant win" condition, Prison decks establish an "inevitable never lose" condition by preventing attacks, or damage, or resource generation.
 Gimmick: Threats, Tempo, Essential - A gimmick deck burns all of its resources trying to force a specific interaction, but the interaction is not one that guarantees a win. A gimmick deck is a lot like a combo deck; capable of extremely strong and explosive plays when all the gears mesh, but either the window for capitalizing on these kinds of plays is extremely small, or the interaction is so vulnerable to disruption that the deck completely falls apart without it.
 Meta: Answers, Tempo, Essential - A meta deck is designed to shut down whatever dominant deck is ruling at the moment, at the cost of all other matchups. Usually, this is what your deck turns into when you're desperately side-boarding against an otherwise un-winnable matchup.

Recent design philosophy
Traditionally, Aggro was seen as advantaged over Control, Control advantaged over Combo, and Combo advantaged over Aggro.  Wizards of the Coast has sought to make high casting-cost spells more powerful than in the early days of Magic, and have also wanted to play up creature combat more - an aggressive deck should have to worry about blocking and opposing creatures even from Control and Combo decks.  To that end, R&D member Zac Hill described an ideal metagame structured such that:

 "Midrange" is advantaged over "Aggro"
 "Aggro" is advantaged over "Control" and "Disruptive Aggro"
 "Control" and "Disruptive Aggro" are advantaged over "Ramp" and "Combo"
 "Ramp" and "Combo" are advantaged over "Midrange"

Each of these 4 categories would ideally occupy around 25% of a given metagame.  In Hill's definition, Aggro refers most specifically to the fastest creature decks built to punish slow starts, ponderous Control decks, and aggressive decks who've substituted out damage for disruption.  Midrange decks in this definition are slower creature-based decks who trump the speed of fast aggro with better quality from their somewhat more expensive spells.  (Both of these would likely be considered "Aggro" in the traditional definition.)  "Ramp" and "Combo" are conceptually similar as noted above; while the combo deck might seek to set up a combination of 2 or 3 cards for a powerful, game-changing effect, the ramp deck instead focuses on building mana as fast as possible and then casting game-changing yet expensive spells, or taking advantage of certain interactions that require a large manabase.  A midrange deck often doesn't have the sheer speed to stop ramp or combo from either casting a huge spell or "going off" with the combo.  Control decks can counter or otherwise answer the single big threat ramp decks and combo decks provide while winning the long game.  Similarly, "disruptive aggro" (equivalent to Aggro-Control in the classic archetypes above) can also stop the single threat Combo and Ramp offer while focusing on winning faster. These rules can change however as blocks cycle and meta shifts.

References

Magic: The Gathering